Vijayamma Rajappan Sankar, commonly known as Sankar (Malayalam – ശങ്കർ), is an Indian film director, screenwriter, short story writer and novelist who works in Malayalam cinema and literature.

Early and personal life 
Sankar was born on 13 April 1981 in Palamoodu village near Vembayam, Thiruvananthapuram, Kerala. After schooling from LPS and Gvt.BHS Kanniakulangara, he completed his graduation from Govt. College Nedumangad. He started his career as a media journalist and short story writer. He has also done audio programmes for Aakashavani, Thiruvananthapuram.

As director
Sankar is a self-taught filmmaker. His debut film as a director is Streetlight.

Streetlight

Streetlight (Malayalam - സ്ട്രീറ്റ്ലൈറ്റ് Sţrīṛṛlaiṛṛ) is a Malayalam film written and directed by Sankar. The film was shot entirely in Kerala with a cast that includes Aparna Nair, Irshad, Krishnan Balakrishnan and Maya Viswanath. The story of the movie is a free adaptation of the Malayalam novel written by Sankar named "Oru pennum parayathathu" (the story never told by a woman) and narrates the life of a prostitute who fights against the corrupt and malignant socio-political environment of Kerala society and finally makes her way successfully as a committed social worker. Her life is a journey from social alienation and stigma into a transformed and socially concerned person who becomes a godsend for the large group of orphaned children.

The central character, Hima hails from a middle-class family in southern Travancore. Her father under the influence of alcohol, rapes her while she is still an adolescent. Her mother learns about it and kills herself. Following this, her father leaves the family. Her brother misuses her to his own advantage. Left as almost an orphan, she ventures into labor work to make a livelihood. But there too she faces exploitation and harassment from male workers.

Later pressure from all sides drags her into prostitution. She adopts a minor girl raped and abandoned by some unknown persons. As she finds out the bitter truth of being an Aids patient, she decides to entrust the child to an orphanage and gets ready to face death. Her old friend Murukan seeks to sleep with her. But she backs out and forbids him, so as not to get him infected with the deadly disease. Her life takes a miraculous turn as she gives up the thought of suicide and takes up the role of a brave-hearted and committed social worker. Adopting many street children and pioneering women's and children's welfare, she carves out her own place in the society.

Her autobiography wins the state award for literature. And the Mother Teresa award for the best social worker is given to her.

The cast is Aparna Nair as Hima, Irshad as Sakhavu, Krishnan Balakrishnan as Murukan, Praveen Prem as Room Boy Kumar, Pro.Aliyar as Father, Krishna as Brother, Sunitha as Mother, Maya Viswanath as Dr Saraladevi, Ambika Mohan. The film was produced by R. K. Kurup under the banner of Ridge Event and media Pvt. Ltd., and distributed by SENSE Group. Songs are composed by Kaithapram Vishwanathan Nambudiri; singers are K. J. Yesudas, Madhu Balakrishnan and others. Cinematography is by AnishLal who had cranked camera for Sankar's earlier films; sound design is by N.Harikumar; art design is by Arkan S. Kollam.

Writing career 
Sankar is also known for his bold stands, reactions, and writings on social and political issues at various magazines. His articles made many controversies and widely discussed in Kerala. Oru valakilukkathinte Oarmakku (Memories of the Bangles) is his first published short story collection. Oru Pennum Parayathathu (The Story Never Told by a Woman) is his first published novel. Poopoloral (A Man Like a Rose) and Kaappi marangalkkidayile penkutty (The Girl from Coffee Country) are his other books.

Television projects 
He has scripted and directed few television programmes like 'Sindhurasmaranakal', 'Gramodhayam', 'Archana', 'Nakshatraperuma', 'Nirammankiya Ormangalilude', Priyappetta Mammootty Arangettam, Story Time, Oarmayiloode, etc. scripted documentary like "Havyam", 'Varnacharthu', etc. He received the Holy Faith Television Award for the TV programme Priyappetta Mammootty. He also got the Mahatmaji Kathasamanam for the year 1998.

References

External links 
 'timesofindia' articles
 'sensegroup' profile
 'movie sulekha' page
 'Malayalam cinema' streetlight page
 'Times of india' article

Living people
1981 births
Screenwriters from Thiruvananthapuram
Malayalam film directors
Indian male novelists
Indian male short story writers
Malayalam short story writers
Malayalam screenwriters
Malayalam-language writers
Malayalam novelists
Malayalam-language lyricists
Film directors from Thiruvananthapuram
Novelists from Kerala
Indian documentary film directors
Indian documentary filmmakers
Malayali people
20th-century Indian dramatists and playwrights
Film producers from Kerala
Film producers from Thiruvananthapuram